Susan Anne Groom (born 28 March 1963 in Wokingham) is an Anglican priest. She has been the Archdeacon of Wilts since 2016.

Groom was educated at Chosen Hill School; Bangor University; Hughes Hall, Cambridge; London Bible College; the Open University; Durham University;  and the University of St Mark & St John. She  was ordained deacon in 1996, and priest in 1997. After curacies at Harefield and Eastcote she was vicar of Yiewsley (London Borough of Hillingdon) from 2001 to 2007. She was the Director of Deanery Licensed Ministers for the Diocese of London from 2007 to 2009; priest-in-charge of the united benefice of Henlow and Langford, Bedfordshire (Diocese of St Albans); then Director of Ordinands for the Diocese of St Albans from 2009 to 2016.

References

1963 births
Alumni of Bangor University
Alumni of Hughes Hall, Cambridge
Alumni of the London School of Theology
Alumni of the Open University
Alumni of Durham University
Alumni of Plymouth Marjon University
20th-century English Anglican priests
21st-century English Anglican priests
Archdeacons of Wilts
Living people
People educated at Chosen Hill School
Women Anglican clergy